Dale Andrew Fisher FRACP (born 1960) is an Australian physician who specialises in Infectious Diseases and is a Senior Consultant in the Division of Infectious Diseases at the National University Hospital, Singapore. He is also a professor of medicine at the Yong Loo Lin School of Medicine, National University of Singapore (2004 -), the chair of the National Infection Prevention and Control Committee through the Ministry of Health, Singapore (2013 -), and chair of the steering committee of the Global Outbreak Alert and Response Network (2017 -) hosted by the World Health Organization.

Fisher has written numerous peer-reviewed articles in medical journals. In addition, he is involved in numerous international medical committees and groups dealing with infectious diseases and outbreak response. He has published on various diseases, including melioidosis, Outpatient Parenteral Antibiotic Therapy (OPAT), Severe Acute Respiratory Disease (SARS), infection control in hospital settings especially as it relates to multi-drug-resistant pathogens and most recently COVID-19.

During the COVID-19 pandemic, which began in China, Fisher was part of the World Health Organization's team that visited China to understand about the virus, and to guide the global response to the pandemic. In October 2021 he received the National Outstanding Clinician Award from Singapore's Minister of Health and soon after was listed in Singapore's Tattler Magazine as one of the most influential people of 2021.

Early life and education

Fisher was born in Melbourne in 1960 but moved to Hobart, Tasmania in 1973 when his father (1926-2013) was appointed the Registrar of Motor Vehicles. His mother (1929-) was a nurse who worked shifts, in order to bring in a second income throughout Fisher's schooling years.

In 1976, he attended United World College of South East Asia in Singapore under a scholarship provided by the State and Federal Governments.

Fisher received his Bachelor of Medicine and Bachelor of Surgery (MBBS) degree from the University of Tasmania in 1985 and became a Fellow of the Royal Australasian College of Physicians (FRACP) in 1992, doing most of his training at the Royal Prince Alfred Hospital, Sydney. His final year of training was in Darwin under the supervision of Professor Bart Currie.

He moved to Singapore in 2003, after working more than a decade at the Royal Darwin Hospital in infectious diseases and general internal medicine.

Career and research
Fisher began his career as a Staff Specialist Physician at the Royal Darwin Hospital (RDH) in 1993 specialising in Infectious Diseases, before progressing to become the Director of Division of Medicine. He came to Singapore in 2003, after responding to a call to assist with the SARS epidemic in Singapore. In 2006, he was appointed Clinical Director of Medicine at the National University Hospital, Singapore, where he maintained his strong commitment to general medicine as a clinician and a teacher, despite his work and experience as an infectious disease physician.

In addition to his career in hospitals, Fisher is actively involved in the international medical community. He began his involvement in the Global Outbreak Alert and Response Network (GOARN) in 2009 as a training faculty in Laos, and has undertaken numerous operational and training missions as well as consultations in many countries through GOARN as well as bilateral arrangements.

In response to H1N1 2009 outbreaks, he undertook missions as requested at the National level deploying to Malaysia, Mongolia, China and Myanmar. Likewise at the request of WHO and the Liberian Government he undertook missions for the Ebola response through 2014-5 which lead to a number of published reviews and commentaries relating to clinical care and infection prevention and control. He has participated in several WHO Guidelines Development Groups in infection control, including related to Ebola, measles and COVID-19. He currently sits as Chair of the GOARN Steering Committee and Chair of the National Infection Prevention and Control (NIPC) Committee in Singapore, and chairs the OPAT workgroup of the International Society of Antimicrobial Chemotherapy.

In February 2020, Fisher was on the World Health Organization-led team that visited China to understand technical aspects of the COVID-19 virus; the severity, transmissibility and interventions that could guide the global response to the pandemic outbreak.

He has published a little under 200 peer-reviewed papers in the medical literature and given around 100 plenary and invited presentations to scientific audiences.

Fisher was also the infectious disease physician who attended to comedian Jerry Lewis, when the late comedian was admitted to hospital for meningitis while on tour in Darwin. Lewis, when interviewed by Larry King, said "God must have put him in "the bush" (aka Darwin) because Dr Fisher was the world's best infectious disease physician."

Bali Bombings - 2002
The 2002 Bali bombings, which occurred in 12 October 2002 resulted in the death of 202 people and injuring many more. As the local hospital was ill-equipped to deal with the scale of disaster, many of the injured were evacuated to Darwin.

Following the bombing, Fisher wrote an article titled "The Bali bombings of 12 October 2002: lessons in disaster management for physicians", which was published in 2003. Fisher's team highlighted that hospital-based physicians should see themselves as a sizeable and flexible group with the ability to contribute in a variety of ways during a disaster.

The team noted that physicians could be deployed for alternate purposes outside of hospital, such as triage and hospital liaison, and should play a central role in the overall management of inpatient care. Such arrangements could free up surgeons, enabling them to provide immediate surgical care for the wounded. In addition, the team also found that heads of departments of Royal Darwin Hospital were adopting a military style of operation themselves, with those receiving the instructions accepted the directives willingly.

It was also opined that the incident left a great impact on the hospital, where the medical team, together with the nurses, patient-care providers, as well as the greater medical community managed an extraordinary undertaking, by handling what was considered the biggest post-war disaster to be ever met by Australian hospitals.

This event would later be identified as significant in determining Fisher's career pathway in outbreak response.

SARS - 2003

During the SARS pandemic in 2003 in Singapore, Fisher with colleagues published several articles related to "Lessons from Singapore". In these articles, it was described that SARS had demonstrated a remarkable efficiency in transmission within hospitals. In fact, 76% of SARS cases in Singapore were acquired in hospitals. They also looked at the circumstances that caused transmission within hospitals, despite the use of personal protective equipment (PPE).

The outbreak in hospitals resulted in dramatic changes in triage and infection-control policies. For instance, healthcare workers were required to monitor their temperatures three times a day. Those with a temperature of more than 37.5c would be removed from duty pending further evaluation. In addition, all patients with respiratory complaints or chest x-ray abnormalities would be isolated, screened for SARS contacts, and managed with full PPE.

In a separate article titled "Atypical presentations of SARS" published in The Lancet, Fisher and colleagues examined the difficulties of managing SARS cases without a diagnostic test. This letter described how the World Health Organization's criteria for probable or suspected SARS case had been misinterpreted. It was intended for epidemiological purposes but instead were used for triage for which they were not sensitive enough. The article concluded that the atypical presentations of SARS pose a threat to patients, staff and visitors, and while the WHO's definition is a useful guide, it does not substitute for a thorough clinical, laboratory and radiological assessment of patients.

Methicillin resistant Staphylococcus aureus - 2008 

In dealing with the high prevalence of methicillin-resistant Staphylococcus aureus (MRSA) within hospitals in Singapore, Fisher has participated and lead many regional and national level workgroups and committees and was key in the national rollout of universal active surveillance for acute hospital admissions.

In the article titled "Methicillin-resistant Staphylococcus aureus Control in Singapore– Moving Forward", he described how MRSA infection in hospitals could be prevented and should not be considered as an accepted tolerable by-product of healthcare. Failure to implement long-term sustainable infection control initiatives is not an option. It was also concluded that the control of MRSA in Singapore could be achieved, but it required implementation of many varied control measures across health services, and possibly would take a decade to do so.

Among many other papers on MRSA, in 2013 he published "Sustained MRSA control in a hyper-endemic tertiary acute care hospital with infrastructure challenges in Singapore". It highlighted falls in bacteraemia, all clinical specimens as well as acquisition rates as a result of the previously described interventions.

For their efforts in reducing the rate of MRSA superbug infection from 1 in 10 patients to 1 in 40, Fisher and his colleagues were awarded the National Clinical Excellence Team Award in 2013 by the Ministry of Health, Singapore.

COVID-19 - 2019-present

During the ongoing COVID-19 pandemic, which began in Wuhan, China, Fisher was part of the WHO delegation that visited China to investigate technical aspects of transmission, severity and interventions preventing spread of the emerging virus. The subsequent report outlined how the world could respond to the outbreak, but warned that the world was not prepared "in capacity or mindset".

He is also involved in many pilot projects that spearhead on research and response. In his article "Q&A: The novel coronavirus outbreak causing COVID-19", Fisher shared his concerns about the emerging virus. For instance, the world's population is completely vulnerable to the novel virus as it is newly emerged in humans, and the current aim of the global response is to flatten the epidemic curve, by interrupting chains of transmission wherever possible. It was also mentioned that while there are deaths that are linked to the virus, the greatest concern right now is the overwhelming of a health system in the wake of excessive transmission.

Fisher is now well known to the media for commentary regarding COVID-19 offered through television, radio, print and social media in dozens of countries of every continent and outlets including CNN, CNBC, BBC, ABC Australia et cetera. In addition he undertakes many webinars and other virtual speaking engagements. His philosophy maintains that COVID-19 can and must be contained. The key outbreak pillars of case management epidemiology, logistics and risk communication/community engagement are critical at all levels. Isolation of cases that are confirmed early by testing is particularly important in this outbreak.

As in some ways the public face of the response in Singapore, Fisher has featured in a comic series "The COVID Chronicles".

Other publications
In addition, Fisher has particular expertise (and publications) in melioidosis and Outpatient Parenteral Antibiotic Therapy,

Other selected publications by Fisher include:

 Earth, wind, rain and melioidosis
 Outpatient parenteral antibiotic therapy (OPAT) in Asia: Missing an Opportunity
 Medicine and the Future of Health: Reflecting on the Past to Forge Ahead
 Advances in prevention and treatment of vancomycin-resistant Enterococcus infection
 Antimicrobial Agents; Optimising the Ecologic Balance
 Infection prevention and control of the Ebola outbreak in Liberia, 2014-2015: key challenges and successes
 Progression from new methicillin-resistant Staphylococcus aureus colonisation to infection: an observational study in a hospital cohort
 An Outcomes Analysis of Outpatient Parenteral Antibiotic Therapy (OPAT) in a large Asian cohort
 Endemic Melioidosis in Tropical Northern Australia: A 10-Year Prospective Study and Review of the Literature
 Hospital Care for Aboriginal and Torres Strait Islanders: Appropriateness and decision-making
 A Cost Analysis of Outpatient Parenteral Antibiotic Therapy (OPAT): An Asian Perspective
 Teaching Hand Hygiene to Medical Students using a Hands-On Approach

References 

Living people
COVID-19 researchers
1960 births
Academic staff of the National University of Singapore
Fellows of the Royal Australasian College of Physicians
People educated at a United World College